Bílý Potok is a municipality and village in Liberec District in the Liberec Region of the Czech Republic. It has about 700 inhabitants.

References

External links

Villages in Liberec District